The 2019 Bol Open was a professional tennis tournament played on outdoor clay courts. It was the fourteenth edition of the tournament and part of the 2019 WTA 125K series. It took place in Bol, Croatia, from 4 to 9 June 2019.

Singles main draw entrants

Seeds 

 1 Rankings as of 27 May 2019.

Other entrants 
The following players received a wildcard into the singles main draw:
  Lea Bošković
  Anna Danilina
  Mihaela Đaković  
  Jana Fett

The following players used protected ranking to enter the singles main draw:
  Denisa Allertová
  Anna-Lena Friedsam
  Anna Tatishvili

Withdrawals 
Before the tournament
  Mona Barthel → replaced by  Paula Badosa Gibert
  Fiona Ferro → replaced by  Olga Danilović
  Daria Gavrilova → replaced by  Beatriz Haddad Maia
  Polona Hercog → replaced by  Varvara Flink
  Kaia Kanepi → replaced by  Bibiane Schoofs
  Johanna Larsson → replaced by  Ekaterine Gorgodze
  Magda Linette → replaced by  Kaja Juvan
  Bernarda Pera → replaced by  Nao Hibino
  Kristýna Plíšková → replaced by  Ana Bogdan
  Iga Świątek → replaced by  Tereza Mrdeža

Doubles entrants

Seeds 

 1 Rankings as of 27 May 2019.

The following team received a wildcard into the doubles draw:
  Lea Bošković /  Mihaela Đaković

Champions

Singles

  Tamara Zidanšek def.  Sara Sorribes Tormo, 7–5, 7–5

Doubles

  Timea Bacsinszky /  Mandy Minella def.  Cornelia Lister /  Renata Voráčová 0–6, 7–6(7–3), [10–4]

References

External links 
 Official website 

2019 WTA 125K series
2019 in Croatian tennis
Croatian Bol Ladies Open
June 2019 sports events in Europe